Brett Hull Hockey '95 is an ice hockey simulation video game released in January 1995 for multiple platforms; including the Super Nintendo Entertainment System, Sega Genesis, and personal computers running DOS.

Summary

The game was developed by Radical Entertainment and published by Accolade. It is the sequel to the original Brett Hull Hockey. The gameplay options include Exhibition, Half Season, Full Season, Play-offs and All-Star. Al Michaels called the play-by-play for every game (including the exhibition and all-star games).

More than 600 authentic hockey players are used for this simulation game. Athletes are rated in skills related to skating, offense, defense, and goaltending skills. The "coach mode" allows players to customize the team in order to meet their gaming needs. There is an NHLPA license in the game but no NHL license; so that teams are only mentioned by city name. The Super NES version only has a password save method instead of a battery backup method due to memory limitations.

Reception

Reviewing the Super NES version, GamePro praised the coaching feature and assessed that Brett Hull Hockey '95, while not as good a game as NHL Hockey '95, has an action-driven style of gameplay which might be more appealing to beginning players and action fans. Next Generation reviewed the SNES version of the game, rating it two stars out of five, and stated that "Sure, it's hockey, but Brett Hull Hockey '95 still stands squarely in the minors."

A different GamePro critic gave the Genesis version a negative review, citing grainy voice, "slow game play and slower control", and the game's emphasis on individual plays rather than teamwork. Next Generation reviewed the Genesis version of the game, rating it one star out of five, and stated that "Brett Hull Hockey '95 is one more feeble attempt at capturing the brutal action of NHL Hockey."

Reviewing the computer release of Brett Hull Hockey '95, Computer Game Review offered a largely negative opinion. The magazine's Ted Chapman concluded, "Boooooorrrriiiinnnnng!"

References

1995 video games
Accolade (company) games
Brett Hull video games
DOS games
Ice hockey video games
Video games set in the United States
Video games set in Canada
Video games developed in Canada
North America-exclusive video games
Radical Entertainment games
Sega Genesis games
Super Nintendo Entertainment System games
Multiplayer and single-player video games
Video games based on real people